Micrilema is a genus of moths in the subfamily Arctiinae. It contains the single species Micrilema craushayi, which is found in Lesotho and South Africa.

References

Natural History Museum Lepidoptera generic names catalog

Lithosiini